The 1987 Swan Premium Open was a men's tennis tournament played on indoor hard courts at the Sydney Entertainment Centre in Sydney in Australia and was part of the 1987 Nabisco Grand Prix. It was the 15th edition of the tournament and was held from 12 October through 18 October 1987. First-seeded Ivan Lendl won the singles title, his second after 1985.

Finals

Singles

 Ivan Lendl defeated  Pat Cash 6–4, 6–2, 6–4
 It was Lendl's 7th title of the year and the 74th of his career.

Doubles

 Darren Cahill /  Mark Kratzmann defeated  Boris Becker /  Robert Seguso 6–3, 6–2
 It was Cahill's only title of the year and the 2nd of his career. It was Kratzmann's 1st title of the year and the 2nd of his career.

References

External links
 ITF tournament edition details

 
Swan Premium Open
Australian Indoor Tennis Championships
Swan
Swan Premium Open
Sports competitions in Sydney
Tennis in New South Wales